Spring Garden station is a SEPTA rapid transit station in Philadelphia, Pennsylvania, United States, on the Market–Frankford Line. It is located on Spring Garden Street between 2nd and Front Streets in the Northern Liberties neighborhood. It is the westernmost station of the Frankford Elevated section of the line and the last westbound station before trains enter Center City Philadelphia.

Though the station's official address is on North Front Street, it is actually located in the median of the Delaware Expressway (Interstate 95) over Spring Garden Street, just north of the highway's interchange with the Vine Street Expressway (Interstate 676). The station is also served by two SEPTA City Bus routes, the 25 and 43.

History 

Spring Garden is one of the newest stations on the line. Spring Garden replaced the nearby Fairmount Avenue station, which was original to the Frankford Elevated that began serving trains in 1922. Fairmount Avenue was a "B" train skip-stop station, although that service pattern has since been discontinued.

Spring Garden is one of three stations on the Market–Frankford Line that is not ADA-accessible, the other two being  and  stations. The addition of elevators in the station was announced in SEPTA's 2021–2032 Capital Program proposal; the station platform would be rehabilitated and made accessible to passengers with disabilities by 2026 at an estimated cost of $7.37 million.  The project also includes the renovation of the existing platforms as well as new signage, lighting, and security cameras.

Station layout 
The station has one island platform – unlike most Market–Frankford stations – with a single entrance/exit on the south side of Spring Garden Street. There is also an exit-only staircase that serves the north side of the street.

References

External links 

 Images at NYCSubway.org

SEPTA Market-Frankford Line stations
Railway stations in Philadelphia
Railway stations in the United States opened in 1977
Railway stations in highway medians